Hard rock band Zebra, known for their legendary live shows, released the album Live in 1990.  The recordings are taken from two shows they performed at Sundance in Bayshore on Long Island on November 25th and 26th 1989.  It features six songs from their debut album, two songs from No Tellin' Lies, three from 3.V, and a single Led Zeppelin cover (a practice they are well known for).

Track listing
All songs written by Randy Jackson, except where indicated.

 "As I Said Before"† - 3:32 (Original version found on Zebra)
 "She's Waiting For You" - 4:25 (Unreleased track)
 "Last Time" - 4:59 (Unreleased track)
 "Wait Until The Summer's Gone" - 3:42 (Original version found on No Tellin' Lies)
 "One More Chance" - 3:38 (Original version found on Zebra)
 "Take Your Fingers From My Hair" - 8:25 (Original version found on Zebra)
 "Bears" - 4:40 (Original version found on No Tellin' Lies)
 "Better Not Call" - 5:33 (Original version found on 3.V)
 "The La La Song" - 10:19 (Original version found on Zebra)
 "Time" - 2:23 (Original version found on 3.V)
 "Who's Behind The Door?" - 6:16 (Original version found on Zebra)
 "He's Making You The Fool"†† - 3:52 (Original version found on 3.V)
 "Tell Me What You Want" - 4:22 (Original version found on Zebra)
 "The Ocean" (John Bonham, John Paul Jones, Jimmy Page and Robert Plant) - 5:00 (Led Zeppelin cover)

†Title listed as "Said Before" on CD.

††Title listed as "Making You The Fool" on CD.

Personnel
Randy Jackson  - guitar, lead vocals
Felix Hanemann - bass, backing vocals, keyboards
Guy Gelso - drums, backing vocals, percussion

References

Zebra (band) albums
1990 live albums
Atlantic Records live albums